Versions is Poison the Well's fourth studio album. It was released on April 2, 2007 in Europe and April 3, 2007 World Wide via Ferret Music. Versions is the first release for Poison the Well on Ferret Music and is also the band's first release since 2003's You Come Before You.

The trio of Ryan Primack (guitar), Chris Hornbrook (drums) and Jeffrey Moreira (vocals) wrote the album over the past few years. Primack describes the material as having many more colors and nuances than previous work. "The songs are pretty open-ended and there's a lot of unique instrumentation in the background throughout such as mandolins, slide guitar, horns and banjo," he says.

Primack, who plays all of the more unusual instruments on the disc, adds, "This is not out of the blue. We actually started to add these elements to the last album but we didn't have time to flesh them out like with 'Versions'. It's going to be a really different sounding album in hardcore. Well, as different as you can be in hardcore nowadays."

Track listing
 "Letter Thing" - 2:28
 "Breathing's for the Birds" - 3:41
 "Nagaina" - 4:10
 "The Notches That Create Your Headboard" - 2:30
 "Pleading Post" - 3:36
 "Slow Good Morning" - 5:05
 "Prematurito el Baby" - 2:53
 "Composer Meet Corpse" - 2:30
 "You Will Not Be Welcomed" - 4:46
 "Naive Monarch" - 2:24
 "Riverside" - 3:02
 "The First Day of My Second Life" - 4:53
Bonus Tracks:
<li>"Wreck Itself Taking You With Me" – 3:21 (European & vinyl bonus track)
<li>"Oceanbreast" 4:17 – (Japanese bonus track)

Singles
To coincide with a string of headlining dates, and in support of Versions, Poison the Well released the album's opening track "Letter Thing" as a digital-only single on March 13. The single is available via iTunes and all other download platforms. A video has also been released for "Letter Thing", directed by Roboshobo (The Blood Brothers, Mates of State). The video features stop motion animation figures which speak in subtitled Norse runes throughout the video, saying the following:
"The hour grows near; The weak flesh shall be tempered by fire; Face what is yours; With this ring, I thee wed"

Credits
Jeffrey Moreira (vocals)
Ryan Primack (guitar, bass, mandolin, banjo, synthesizer, wurlitzer piano and backing vocals)
Chris Hornbrook (drums and percussion)
Jason Boyer (guitar on tracks 4, 6, 9, 11 and 12)
Pelle Henricsson (percussion, synthesizer, wurlitzer piano, second snare drum and noise on all tracks)
Eskil Lövström (muu guitar, trumpet, and trombone on tracks 5, 8 and 11)
Brian Montuori (cover art)

References

Poison the Well (band) albums
Ferret Music albums
2007 albums